Calonotos phlegmon is a moth of the subfamily Arctiinae. It was described by Pieter Cramer in 1775. It is found in Brazil and French Guiana.

References

Arctiinae
Moths described in 1775